Attica Bank S.A., formerly the Bank of Attica SA, is engaged in the Greek banking sector. It is the fifth largest Greek bank. Its headquarters are in Athens and its 48 branches are spread nationwide.

Attica Bank S.A. was established in 1925. Ιt offers a full range of banking and investment products and services as well as deposits, insurance products, mutual funds and brokerage services, for individuals, small and medium enterprises and large companies. It is listed in the Athens Exchange.

In 1964, Attica Bank was acquired by Emporiki Bank Companies Group and was listed on the Athens Stock Exchange (ASE). In June 1997 Emporiki Bank transferred through the ASE part of its shares to the Engineers' and Public Works Contractors' Pension Fund (TSMEDE) and Deposit and Loans Fund (TPD), retaining the 17% of the bank's shares until September 2012, which was then transferred to PostBank.

During 2013–2018, the bank proceeded to the issuance of a convertible Bond Loan as well as to Share Capital Increases aiming at the clean-up of its Balance Sheet and the restructuring of its business model and operations.

In 2021 the bank proceeded with the activation of the provisions of art.27A of L.4172/2013 (DTC) and to the issuance of warrants in favor of the Greek State. On 19 October 2021, the conversion of warrants in favor of the Greek State to common shares was concluded. The bank's shareholding structure was as follows: Hellenic Financial Stability Fund (HFSF) holds 68.2%, Engineers and Public Works Contractors Fund (TMEDE) holds 14.7% and Unified Social Security Institution (EFKA) holds 10.3% of the bank's common ordinary shares.

Furthermore, in December 2021, Attica Bank proceeded to a share capital increase of €240mln, which was fully covered. The Share Capital of the bank was increased by the same amount with the issuance of 1,200,000,000 new, common, registered shares of a nominal value of €0.20 each. The bank's shareholding structure is as follows: Hellenic Financial Stability Fund (HFSF) holds 62.9%, Engineers and Public Works Contractors Fund  (TMEDE) holds 14.7%, Unified Social Security Institution (EFKA) holds 10.3% and RINOA Ltd - Ellington Solution holds 9.9% of the bank's common ordinary shares.

Attica Bank participates in the company of Attica Bancassurance Agency S.A.

Attica Bank applies principles of corporate governance, pursuing to attain transparency in communication with its Shareholders, Executives, Employees, Partners, Contractors and Suppliers, and providing immediate and continuous information to the investing public. By striving to respond consistently to the expectations of the Customers and the State, Attica Bank implements the regulatory framework regarding the financial sector and in particular those things that apply to the fight against corruption. In the context of effective Corporate Governance, the bank applies an integrated internal audit system to the Group in accordance with international standards and the current regulatory framework.

References

See also

List of banks in Greece
Banking in Greece

Banks of Greece
Companies listed on the Athens Exchange
Banks established in 1925
Greek brands